Francis Richard Ziegler (October 1, 1923 – March 6, 2011) was an American football running back in the NFL who played for five seasons for the Philadelphia Eagles.  Frank Ziegler started a tool company with his brother Bill after retiring from the NFL.

References

External links

1923 births
2011 deaths
American football running backs
Georgia Tech Yellow Jackets football players
Philadelphia Eagles players
Players of American football from Georgia (U.S. state)
Sportspeople from College Park, Georgia